İnlice is a small town in Konya Province, Turkey

Geography 

The population is 995  as of 2011.

Economy 

The main economic activity is animal husbandry. Cereal and potato production as well as beekeeping are other activities. But the population is on the decrease, a sign of insufficient arable lands. However in 2010 State Hydraulic Works (DSİ) of Turkey has announced the discovery of thermal source within İnlice.

References 

Populated places in Konya Province
Towns in Turkey
Meram District